Jonas Jacobsson (born 22 June 1965) is a Swedish sport shooter who has won several gold medals at the Paralympic Games. He participated in ten consecutive Summer Paralympics from 1980 to 2016, winning a total of seventeen gold, four silver, and nine bronze medals. In 1996, he won two gold medals in the air rifle 3×40 and English match events and a bronze in the air rifle prone at the Atlanta Paralympics. At the 2000 Summer Paralympics, he took two gold medals in the free rifle 3×40 and free rifle prone events and two bronzes in air rifle standing and air rifle prone events. Four years later, at the Athens Games, he competed in the same four events and won the gold medal in all of them.

On 10 September 2008 Jacobsson won his 16th gold medal in the Paralympic Games making him the best performing male Paralympics contestant so far.  Later that year, he became the first athlete with a physical disability to receive the Svenska Dagbladet Gold Medal, Sweden's most significant sports award.

See also
Athletes with most gold medals in one event at the Paralympic Games

References

External links
 

1965 births
Living people
Swedish male sport shooters
Paralympic shooters of Sweden
Paralympic gold medalists for Sweden
Paralympic silver medalists for Sweden
Paralympic bronze medalists for Sweden
Paralympic medalists in shooting
Shooters at the 1980 Summer Paralympics
Shooters at the 1984 Summer Paralympics
Shooters at the 1988 Summer Paralympics
Shooters at the 1992 Summer Paralympics
Shooters at the 1996 Summer Paralympics
Shooters at the 2000 Summer Paralympics
Shooters at the 2004 Summer Paralympics
Shooters at the 2008 Summer Paralympics
Shooters at the 2012 Summer Paralympics
Medalists at the 1980 Summer Paralympics
Medalists at the 1984 Summer Paralympics
Medalists at the 1988 Summer Paralympics
Medalists at the 1992 Summer Paralympics
Medalists at the 1996 Summer Paralympics
Medalists at the 2000 Summer Paralympics
Medalists at the 2004 Summer Paralympics
Medalists at the 2008 Summer Paralympics
Medalists at the 2012 Summer Paralympics
Sportspeople from Norrköping
20th-century Swedish people
21st-century Swedish people